Roniere Jose da Silva Filho (born 23 April 1986) commonly known as Roni da Silva is a Portuguese professional footballer who plays for Goyang Hi in K League Challenge as a forward.

Club career 
Roniere kicked off his career with Vardinha in 2005 and played for several other Brazilian clubs in the lower divisions till 2011, when he joined Korean third-tier club Ulsan Dolphin. In 2014, he entered professional football on the courtesy of signing for Goyang Hi of K League Challenge. He scored his first goal for the club against Chungju Hummel.

References

External links 
 
 

1986 births
Living people
Association football forwards
Brazilian footballers
Mogi Mirim Esporte Clube players
Associação Atlética Internacional (Limeira) players
Ulsan Hyundai FC players
Goyang Zaicro FC players
K League 2 players
Brazilian expatriate footballers
Batatais Futebol Clube players
Esporte Clube Mamoré players